Brett Johnson (born 19 December 1994) is a New Zealand cricketer. He made his List A debut on 1 February 2020, for Wellington in the 2019–20 Ford Trophy.

References

External links
 

1994 births
Living people
New Zealand cricketers
Wellington cricketers
Place of birth missing (living people)